Money to Burn is the tenth studio album by American rapper C-Bo, released August 8, 2006 on West Coast Mafia Records. It peaked at number 71 on the Billboard Top R&B/Hip-Hop Albums and at number 49 on the Billboard Top Independent Albums. The album features guest performances by Outlawz, Baby Bash, Laroo, Pizzo and Marvaless.

Track listing

Chart history

References

External links 
 [ Money to Burn] at Allmusic
 Money to Burn at Discogs

C-Bo albums
2006 albums
Albums produced by Mike Dean (record producer)
Self-released albums